Colwellia echini is a gram-negative, rod-shaped, and facultatively anaerobic bacterium from the genus Colwellia which has been isolated from the sea urchin Strongylocentrotus droebachiensis from Øresund in Denmark.

References

Alteromonadales
Bacteria described in 2018